The 2016 Chinese Figure Skating Championships was held on December 26 and 27, 2015 in Harbin. Medals were awarded in the disciplines of men's singles, ladies' singles, pair skating, and ice dancing.

Results

Men

Ladies

Pairs

Ice dance

External links
 Results

Chinese Figure Skating Championships
2015 in figure skating
Chinese Figure Skating Championships, 2016
Sport in Harbin